"My Last" is the lead single by American rapper Big Sean featuring American singer Chris Brown, from the former's debut album Finally Famous. The song is produced by No I.D.

Background 
Originally, Sean performed both the verses and the chorus but after Brown turned up at one of Sean's shows, the pair connected and Brown suggested the two work together on a song which resulted in Brown singing the chorus. Brown has also done a freestyle over the track.

Production 
"My Last" is a hip hop and R&B song. The song's instrumental was described by Rap-Up as a "bouncy piano-laced beat".
DJBooth.net described the beat as "soft keyboard chords that transition well into the hook where a low bass and snare set the pace for Sean's first verse." Sean revealed he originally rejected the beat but gave it a chance after pressurings by the song's producer No I.D. The song's melody is sampled from the 1988 New Edition hit "Can You Stand the Rain".

Theme 
Sean described the song as a "real great party song."

Music video 
The music video was shot in West Hollywood, California on March 18, 2011. The music video is directed by TAJ Stansberry and features cameos by former GOOD Music artist Kid Cudi and current GOOD Music artist Teyana Taylor. It debuted on VEVO on March 24, 2011.

Critical reception 
Critical reception of the song has been mostly positive with praise going to the chorus and Sean's verses. Chicago Now described the song as featuring a memorable chorus, memorable verses, and a universal theme praising Big Sean's verses. DJBooth.net also praised Sean's lyrical abilities.

Charts

Weekly charts

Year-end charts

Certifications

References 

2010 songs
2011 singles
Big Sean songs
Chris Brown songs
Song recordings produced by No I.D.
Songs written by Big Sean
GOOD Music singles
Songs written by Jimmy Jam and Terry Lewis
Songs written by No I.D.
Def Jam Recordings singles